Christophe Guérin (1758–1831) was a French engraver and painter. He is notable for his engravings and his reproductions of paintings by Raphael and Correggio.

Life
Born in Strasbourg to the engraver Jean Guérin, he learned drawing and engraving in his father's studio before studying at the École nationale supérieure des beaux-arts in Paris. He returned to his birthplace in 1787 and engraved banknotes, as had his father. In 1803 he became head professor at the city's Galerie des peintures, a post he held until his death. He also took part in the foundation of a drawing school for the city and became its head.

Selected works by museum
 Cambridge (United States), Fogg Art Museum : 
 The Archangel Leading the Young Tobias, after the top of the right panel from the Pavia Charterhouse Altarpiece by Perugino;
 Love Disarmed, after Corregio;
 Saint Benedict's Vision, after Eustache Le Sueur;
 Adrien de Lezay-Marnésia;
 Artemisia II, after Hendrik van Limborch;
 Rest in the countryside, after Philippe-Jacques de Loutherbourg.
 Paris, Bibliothèque nationale de France :
 Honoré-Gabriel Riqueti de Mirabeau, engraving by Lambertus Antonius Claessens after a drawing by Christophe Guérin;
 Claude Florimond Esmangard, counsellor of state;
 Jean Laurent Blessig.
 London, British Museum :
 Portrait of Nicolas Luckner, marshal of France;
  Crossing the Stream, after Philippe-Jacques de Loutherbourg;
 Mary Magdalen Contemplating A Crucifix, after Correggio;
 The Dance of the Muses, after Giulio Romano;
 Nicolas François de Neufchâteau;
 Christ Crowned With Thorns;
 The Sibyl
 Jean-Baptiste Treilhard, minister plenipotentiary to the Council of Rasdtadt.

Gallery

References

18th-century engravers
19th-century engravers
French engravers
1758 births
1831 deaths
Artists from Strasbourg